Hypaeus is a genus of the spider family Salticidae (jumping spiders).

Species
, the World Spider Catalog accepted the following species:

Hypaeus annulifer Simon, 1900 – Brazil
Hypaeus barromachadoi Caporiacco, 1947 – Guyana
Hypaeus benignus (Peckham & Peckham, 1885) – Mexico to Panama
Hypaeus concinnus Simon, 1900 – Brazil
Hypaeus cucullatus Simon, 1900 – Ecuador
Hypaeus duodentatus Crane, 1943 – Guyana
Hypaeus estebanensis Simon, 1900 – Venezuela
Hypaeus femoratus Araújo & Ruiz, 2015 – Brazil
Hypaeus flavipes Simon, 1900 – Brazil
Hypaeus flemingi Crane, 1943 – Venezuela, Brazil
Hypaeus frontosus Simon, 1900 – Brazil
Hypaeus ignicomus Simon, 1900 – Brazil
Hypaeus luridomaculatus Simon, 1900 – Brazil
Hypaeus miles Simon, 1900 – Brazil, Guyana, French Guiana
Hypaeus mystacalis (Taczanowski, 1878) – Ecuador, Peru
Hypaeus nigrocomosus Simon, 1900 – Brazil
Hypaeus pauciaculeis (Caporiacco, 1947) – Guyana
Hypaeus porcatus (Taczanowski, 1871) – French Guiana
Hypaeus poseidon Araújo & Ruiz, 2015 – Brazil
Hypaeus quadrinotatus Simon, 1900 – Brazil
Hypaeus taczanowskii (Mello-Leitão, 1948) (type species) – French Guiana, Guyana, Brazil
Hypaeus terraemediae Araújo & Ruiz, 2015 – Brazil
Hypaeus tridactylus Araújo & Ruiz, 2015 – Brazil
Hypaeus triplagiatus Simon, 1900 – Brazil, Peru
Hypaeus venezuelanus Simon, 1900 – Venezuela

References

External links
 Image catalogue for Hypaeus at Jumping spiders of the world

Salticidae
Spiders of Mexico
Spiders of Central America
Spiders of South America
Salticidae genera